Devil's Doorway is a 1950 American Western film directed by Anthony Mann and starring Robert Taylor as an Indian who returns home from the American Civil War a hero awarded the Medal of Honor. However, his hopes for a peaceful life are shattered by bigotry and greed.

Plot
The Civil War may be over back East, but prejudice still rules the West. A full-blooded Shoshone Indian named Lance Poole distinguished himself in the war, winning the Medal of Honor, only to return home to Medicine Bow, Wyoming, to something a far cry from a hero's welcome.

Townspeople resent the fact that Lance and his father own a large and valuable piece of land. A doctor refuses to treat Lance's father, who dies, while Lance himself is unable to even buy a drink in the local saloon. A loophole in a law involving homesteaders is used by biased attorney Verne Coolan to strip Lance of his property. Lance turns to a female lawyer, Orrie Masters, who fails to acquire the necessary petition signatures they need to overturn the law.

Coolan organizes sheepherders and attempts to drive out Lance by force. Shoshone tribesmen fight by Lance's side, using his cabin for a fort. Orrie calls in the U.S. Cavalry to create a truce, only to have them side with Coolan and the town. It's a lost cause. Lance is at least able to kill Coolan, but not before being already seriously wounded himself at the Shoshone barricade.

Lance Poole then turns the responsibility for the surviving women and children over to the only surviving male child, who leads them away from the barricade and presumably in the direction of the reservation. Afterward, Lance puts on his civil war sergeant major's uniform, and walks out to the cavalry commander and his former lawyer. The commander salutes Poole first, as that is the custom when greeting a medal of honor recipient. Lance then dies from exsanguination.

Cast
Robert Taylor as Lance Poole
Louis Calhern as Verne Coolan
Paula Raymond as Orrie Masters
Marshall Thompson as Rod MacDougall
James Mitchell as Red Rock
Edgar Buchanan as Zeke Carmody
Rhys Williams as Scotty MacDougall
Spring Byington as Mrs. Masters
James Millican as Ike Stapleton
Bruce Cowling as Lieutenant Grimes
Fritz Leiber as Mr. Poole

Reception
According to MGM records the film earned $1,349,000 in the US and Canada and $747,000 overseas, resulting in a profit of $25,000.

Critical response
Bosley Crowther called the movie a "whopping action film".  He notes "Devil's Doorway, like the Twentieth Century-Fox picture of a few months back, Broken Arrow, is a Western with a point of view that rattles some skeletons in our family closet. Robert Taylor may strike you as a rather peculiar choice to play a full-blooded Indian, but give the man credit for a forceful performance. Indeed, his is the only role that is not a stereotype. However, the other players give good performances even though they represent characters that are as much a part of the Western film formula as horses and sagebrush."

References

External links
 
 
 
 

1950 films
American Western (genre) films
1950 Western (genre) films
American black-and-white films
Films directed by Anthony Mann
Films scored by Daniele Amfitheatrof
Films shot in Colorado
Metro-Goldwyn-Mayer films
Revisionist Western (genre) films
1950s English-language films
1950s American films